Khan Abdul Majid Khan Tarin (also spelt Abdul Majeed Khan) (1877–1939), Khan-Sahib, OBE, was a prominent magistrate, MLA and philanthropist of the North West Frontier Province of former British India.

Early life and education

He was born to a prominent Pathan landlord and aristocrat from Hazara Division, Muhammad Habib Khan Tarin (or Tareen), (c.1829/30-Dec.1888), Hon. Nawab Bahadur, Risaldar, CSI, who was also an ex-cavalry officer and a landed jagirdar of Talokar and Dheri estates in Haripur, NWFP (present-day, Khyber Pakhtunkhwa). At his father's death Majid Khan was a young boy and the family estates were placed under the  Court of Wards. He was initially taught at home by English tutors, then sent to the Aitchison College, Lahore, and then to a mission school in Simla. After his Matriculation from there he proceeded to England in 1899 and qualified as a barrister in 1901. He was called to the Bar at Lincoln's Inn in April 1902.

Career

On returning to India, he became a Junior Magistrate in the Punjab service, then a 1st Class Magistrate, Extra Assistant Commissioner and then Deputy Commissioner; he also served briefly as a Judge in the Punjab Sessions Courts and on retiring from service in 1934, he became an early and active member of the NWFP (now Khyber-Pakhtunkhwa in Pakistan) chapter of the All India Muslim League and a close associate of Sir Sahibzada Abdul Qayyum, also serving as a Member of the NWFP Legislative Assembly (1937–1939). Although keen to protect Muslim rights, he remained a firm proponent of a consolidated Muslim entity within a larger Indian confederation, till the end. He died at his ancestral village, Talokar, in June 1939.

Legacy
Khan Sahib Abdul Majid Khan Tarin was also a very active philanthropist. Apart from his support of the establishment of the Islamia College, Peshawar, and support to various Indian Muslim charities, he played a considerable role in the early development of his native Haripur area in Hazara, NWFP. He founded several charitable schools, set up a public Tuberculosis ward at the Haripur Government Hospital, provided for a system of educational scholarships for local students as well as supporting numerous needy people. This tradition of public service has been carried on by his family.

Khan Sahib had three sons and two daughters. His eldest son, Abdus Salim Khan, a noted Pakistani diplomat, was married to the well-known former Pakistani minister, Begum Mahmooda Salim Khan, daughter of the late Punjab Premier, Sardar Sir Sikandar Hayat Khan (1892–1942). His second son Abdul Hamid Khan was an agriculturist of NWFP, whilst his third son, Abdul Rashid Khan, was commissioned in the British Indian Army and later served in the Pakistan Army after the independence of Pakistan in 1947. The Pakistani poet and research scholar, Omer Tarin is a great-grandson of Abdul Majid Khan Tarin.

References

1877 births
People from British India
All India Muslim League members
Officers of the Order of the British Empire
Aitchison College alumni
Alumni of the Inns of Court School of Law
1939 deaths
People from Haripur District
Hindkowan people
Pakistani landowners